Oras Sattar (born July 29, 1981 in Baghdad, Iraq), is an Iraqi singer, composer and songwriter.

Discography

Singles
2010: A3len Et-tawbah
2011: Hobbi Whanany
2011: Fedwa Fedwa
2011: Hananak
2012: 3ala Mayyah
2012: Ana Ahebak
2014: Makw Qesmah
2015: Shetsawy Sawy
2016: Enty Ommy
2016: Ekhtareet Gheery
2016: Wallah Ma Naseek
2017: Ya Jamalak
2017: Hob Majnoon
2017: Ya Tery

See also
List of best-selling music artists

References

Living people
1981 births
Musicians from Baghdad
21st-century Iraqi male singers
Male singer-songwriters